Karl Wilhelm of Hesse-Darmstadt (17 June 1693, Nidda - 17 May 1707, Gießen) was a Prince of Hesse-Darmstadt.

Life 
Charles William was the second son of Ernest Louis, Landgrave of Hesse-Darmstadt (1667–1739) from his marriage to Dorothea Charlotte (1661–1705), daughter of Albert II, Margrave of Brandenburg-Ansbach.

When Charles William was four years-old, his father appointed him Colonel of the newly created Hesse-Darmstadt Kreis Regiment. Two years later, the education of Charles William was handed over to Johann Konrad Dippel in Gießen, where the Landgrave's family had fled before the advancing French troops.

Karl Wilhelm died at the age of 13, during the War of Spanish Succession.  His younger brother Prince Francis Ernest of Hessen-Darmstadt took his place in the Regiment.

References 

 August Justus Alexander Keim (1845–1926): Geschichte des Infanterie-Leibregiments Grossherzogin (3. Grossherzogl. hessisches) Nr. 117 und seiner Stämme 1677-1902, Berlin, A. Bath, 1903
 M1 Gold Stephan Schmidt: Johann Konrad Dippel (1673–1734), p. 147 ff.

House of Hesse-Darmstadt
1693 births
1707 deaths
Princes of Hesse-Darmstadt
People from Nidda
Colonels (military rank)
Child soldiers
Military personnel of the War of the Spanish Succession
Royalty and nobility who died as children
Sons of monarchs